Sexualities is a bimonthly peer-reviewed academic journal that covers the field of gender studies. The editors-in-chief are Feona Attwood, Travis S. K. Kong, and Roisin Ryan-Flood. It was established in 1998 and is published by SAGE Publications.

Abstracting and indexing
The journal is abstracted and indexed in Scopus and the Social Sciences Citation Index.  According to the Journal Citation Reports, the journal has a 2017 impact factor of 1.091.

References

External links

SAGE Publishing academic journals
English-language journals
Gender studies journals
Bimonthly journals
Publications established in 1998
Sexology journals